Harry Schellekens (born 5 November 1952 in Boxtel, North Brabant) is a former association football goalkeeper, who played for NEC Nijmegen, FC Groningen and Vitesse Arnhem. Once he was a reserve player for the Netherlands national football team, on 30 May 1975 against Yugoslavia in Belgrade.

References
  NEC Profile
  FC Groningen Profile

1952 births
Living people
Association football goalkeepers
Dutch footballers
FC Groningen players
NEC Nijmegen players
People from Boxtel
SBV Vitesse players
Footballers from North Brabant